Shenina Syawalita Cinnamon (born February 1, 1999) is an Indonesian actress. She made her lead role debut in Photocopier, which also led her being nominated for the Citra Award for Best Actress at the 2021 Indonesian Film Festival.

Early life and career
Shenina Syawalita Cinnamon born in Jakarta, Indonesia on February 1, 1999. She is the daughter of Indonesian scriptwriter, film producer and director Harris Cinnamon.

Cinnamon made her debut as an actress through various television film titles and through her role as Yasmin in Roman Picisan: The Series. The opportunity to play in feature films began to be obtained through Tumbal: The Ritual in 2018. Since then, her name has been taken into account in several prestigious film titles such as The Queen of Black Magic in 2019. 2021 was the year of Cinnamon's debut as the main actor through Photocopier which also led her being nominated for the Citra Award for Best Actress at the 2021 Indonesian Film Festival.

Filmography

Film

Television

Awards and nominations

References

External links
 
 

1999 births
Living people
21st-century Indonesian actresses
Indonesian film actresses
Actresses from Jakarta